Colfe's School, previously Colfe's Grammar School is a co-educational private day school in Lee in the London Borough of Lewisham, in southeast London, England, and one of the oldest schools in London. The school is a member of the Headmasters' and Headmistresses' Conference. The official Visitor to the school is Prince Michael of Kent.

History
Colfe's is one of the oldest schools in London. The parish priest of Lewisham taught the local children from the time of Richard Walker's chantry, founded in 1494, until the dissolution of the monasteries by Henry VIII. Rev. John Glyn re-established the school in 1568 and it was granted a Charter by Elizabeth I in 1574. Abraham Colfe became a Governor in 1613 and the school was re-founded bearing his name in 1652.

Colfe declared that the aim of the school was to provide an education for the boys from "the Hundred of Blackheath". He invited the Leathersellers' Company, one of London's livery companies, to be the trustee of his will. Links between the school and the Leathersellers remain strong.

The school was originally built around Colfe's house with an entrance in Lewisham Hill. The site was progressively developed and extended until 1890, when it was completely rebuilt on the same site with its entrance now in Granville Park. During the Second World War the school was first evacuated to Tunbridge Wells, Kent, and then to Frome in Somerset. A period of inactivity on the Western front led about 100 boys to return to London, so the school was split for a few years. In 1944 a V2 (Flying bomb) almost totally destroyed the school.

At the end of the War, with no school buildings and the pupil roll having halved, it was uncertain if the school would continue. In London the school was split between two sites – Beacon Road School in Hither Green and Ennersdale Road School, about a quarter of a mile away. "Temporary" buildings (rows of pre-fabricated concrete construction) were erected and the school came together again in 1947 under the headmastership of Herbert Beardwood MSc. The "temporary" buildings were still being used until the move to the new site in 1963.

Herbert Beardwood updated Leland Duncan's "History of Colfe's Grammar School" in 1952, in celebration of the school's tercentenary under Colfe's name.  The book was further updated by Beardwood in 1972, to reflect both the move to the present campus at the east end of the playing fields, and the impact on the school of the machinations of early 1970s UK politics.

The school moved to its current site in 1963 and since then there has been much change: improved facilities have been provided, such as an all-weather sports pitch, a performing arts centre, and new classroom facilities. The Leathersellers' sports ground has been renovated to make it the home of senior sport (rugby, football and cricket).

Having been a voluntary aided grammar school, Colfe's became independent again in 1977. Although founded as a school for boys, girls have been admitted to the Sixth Form for over thirty years. In 1997, it was decided to allow girls throughout the school, and today the school is fully co-educational.

Current organisation

The School admits pupils at the age of 3 into the Nursery, from which they progress to the Junior School aged 4. From here pupils make the transition to the Senior school at the age of 11.

Senior School (Ages 1118)

The Senior School is based at the top of the main school site. An all-weather playing field (funded in part by donations from parents and former pupils) was opened in 2006. Many of the facilities are shared with the Junior School. Opened in September 2015 the new Stuart building now houses the Maths and RP departments and the sixth form area. There is a café and a sixth form common room.

There is a House system at Colfe's. The Houses are named after four long serving Headmasters; Beardwood, Bramley, Norton and Prendergast. Throughout the school year each pupil takes part in a full and varied programme of activities outside the main curriculum, in which the pupils participate in healthy competition by age groups to help his or her house win at the end of the year. From September 2012, Colfe's has also introduced tutoring in Houses. Pupils are in mixed age tutor groups with other students from the same House. A team of House tutors is led by a Head of House who has oversight of pastoral and academic progress of the students in their House.

Junior School (Ages 311)

The Junior School is located at the bottom of the school site, in two self-contained buildings. One of the buildings is for EYFS and KS1 and the other for KS2. The Junior School has the same high standards as the Senior School and also shares many of the facilities including the sports complex, the fields and the Performing Arts Centre.

Colfeians 

Eric Ambler OBE (19091998), novelist.
Professor Henry Armstrong FRS (18481937) Chemist.
Sir John Bennett (18141897), politician and watchmaker.
 Sir Antonio Brady (18111881), Admiralty official, naturalist, and social reformer.
Sir Richard Madox Bromley (1813–1865), civil servant.
 Garry Bushell, journalist and musician.
 James Cleverly, Conservative politician.
 Paul Clinton, cricketer.
 Richard Clinton, cricketer.
Billy Cooper, Barmy Army England cricket trumpeter
Brian Fahey, musician, arranger and musical director. 
Christopher Fowler (novelist and journalist)
 Sir Alan Goodison, diplomat.
 Professor Kenneth Grayston, professor of theology.
 Malcolm Hardee, comedy club proprietor. 
 John Henry Hayes, Conservative politician.
 Andrew Shoben, artist, professor, Broadcaster.
 Jeff Hearn, Assistant Professor of Economics and Business Administration.
 Conor Henderson, professional footballer.
 Norman Hepple RA RP (19081994), portrait painter
 Peter Howitt, actor, film writer and director.
 Jem Karacan, professional footballer.
 Robert Key, England cricketer
 David Lindsay, (18761945), novelist, author of A Voyage to Arcturus. 
 F.L. Lucas (18941967), literary critic and writer.
 James Marsh, Academy Award-winning film maker of Man on Wire,
 Edmund Nelson, (19102007), portrait painter.
 Steve Parish, Chairman of Crystal Palace F.C.
 Claire Rafferty, English female international footballer.
 Tony Reeves, musician with Greenslade, Curved Air and Colosseum
 Olly Robbins, UK Prime Minister's European Adviser
 Jack Ryder, actor
 Professor Maurice George 'Dick' Say, (19021992), electrical engineer.
Keith Colin Smith, (19652000) stellar spectroscopist and astrophysicist.
 Professor William Alexander Campbell Stewart (19151997), educationist and university administrator.
Francis Stock, Vice-Chancellor of the University of Natal 
Dennis Main Wilson, producer of television and radio comedy.
 Henry Williamson, author of Tarka the Otter.
 Victor Maslin Yeates, World War I Royal Flying Corps fighter ace.

Further reading 
 Leland L. Duncan The History of Colfe's Grammar School and a life of its founder 1910.

References 

The History of Colfe's Grammar School by Leland L. Duncan (revised and updated by H Beardwood), pub: University of London Press, 1952

External links
 

1652 establishments in England
Educational institutions established in the 1650s
Buildings and structures in Eltham
Private co-educational schools in London
Private schools in the Royal Borough of Greenwich
Lee, London
Member schools of the Headmasters' and Headmistresses' Conference